St John Surridge Pike (27 December 190913 November 1992) was an Anglican bishop in the third quarter of the twentieth century.

Educated at Trinity College, Dublin and  ordained in 1934, he began his career with a curacy at Taney. After this he was Head of the Southern Church Mission, Ballymacarrett then  Rector of St George’s, Belfast. In 1958 he was elevated to the episcopate as Bishop of Gambia and the Rio Pongas. On his return from Africa he became an Assistant Bishop of Guildford and held incumbencies at Ewshot (until 1971) and at Botleys with Lyne and Long Cross (from 1971) until his retirement (as Vicar and as Assistant Bishop) on 26 November 1983.

References

 

1909 births
Alumni of Trinity College Dublin
Anglican bishops of Gambia and the Rio Pongas
20th-century Anglican bishops in Africa
1992 deaths
Assistant bishops of Guildford
Irish expatriate Protestant bishops